Germán Herrera may refer to:

 Germán Herrera (footballer, born 1983), Argentine forward for Rosario Central
 Germán Herrera (footballer, born 1993), Argentine midfielder for Club Atlético Brown